The New Philippines ( or ) was the abbreviated name of a territory in New Spain.

The territory was named in honor of its sovereign, King Philip V of Spain. The New Philippines ceased to be a legal entity upon the extinction of New Spain in 1821.

Limits
This province of New Spain overlapped in part with the current U.S. state of Texas, but its territory was substantially different. The land consisted of the region north of the Medina and Nueces rivers, in what is now South-Central Texas; i.e., only the Central-Northern part of the current state overlaps with the territory of the New Philippines.

The Medina River was the official border between New Extremadura and the New Philippines. West of the Medina headwaters, the southern border was with Nueva Vizcaya. The border with Nuevo Santander was the Nueces River.

To the west, the New Philippines bordered Nueva Vizcaya and Nuevo México; to the north, the border almost reached the Red River; to the east, the border was consecutively French, Spanish, and finally American.

Disputed eastern border
France claimed its border extended west and south to the Rio Grande (thus entirely negating the existence of New Philippines); conversely, Spain claimed its east border extended to the Red River. The French founded Natchitoches in 1714 east of the Red River, (later moving their post from the east to the west side of the river about 1734), and the Spanish founded Los Adaes in 1721 near present-day Robeline, Louisiana, only 12 miles (19 km) from Natchitoches. Informally, the border was set at the Arroyo Hondo, located between the French and the Spanish settlements, for the next 98 years. Following the 1819 Treaty of Adams-Onís, the New Spain and Louisiana border moved 45 miles (72 km) west to the Sabine River and remained there until the extinction of New Spain in 1821.

History
In the 16th century, the northern frontier of New Spain was Nueva Vizcaya, beginning from 1531. As development increased in the 17th century, a new province was created on its east in 1687, namely, Nueva Extremadura, a very extensive territory at the time, now identified with the much smaller state of Coahuila, in Mexico. 

In 1722, the northeast of Nueva Extremadura was politically detached and officially named Nuevo Reino de las Filipinas, also known by its short form, Nuevas Filipinas. The second Marqués de Aguayo was named governor of the New Philippines.

Origins of the name

The name was first used by Antonio Margil in July 1716, during his participation in Domingo Ramón's expedition to prevent French expansion from Louisiana. Some sources say it was Ramón himself who used it first, followed by Margil on his July letter. The next record of the name is a letter written by Isidro de Espinosa in February 1718.

The name first appeared in an official document in 1718, in a letter addressed to Martín de Alarcón: A March 11, 1718 instruction letter for Alarcon's 1718 reinforcements expedition refers to "Nuevas Filipinas", differentiating the New Philippines from the province of Coahuila and New Extremadura. In a report of his services to the Spanish government, Alarcón would go on to refer to himself as "governor and lieutenant captain general of the Province of the Texas and New Philippines." Alarcón signed the foundation document of the San Antonio de Valero mission, dating it May 1, 1718, in his capacity as "General of the Provinces of the Kingdom of the New Philippines." Much later, the mission would be garrisoned and become the site of the 1836 Battle of the Alamo.

Use of the name in monographs and chronicles
Juan Antonio de la Peña, a participant in the Marqués de Aguayo expedition, wrote Derrotero de la expedición en la provincia de los Texas, Nuevo Reyno de Philipinas, and had it printed in México in 1722.

Pedro de Rivera y Villalón, a brigadier general, described the Reino de Nuevas Philipinas, which he inventoried during his 1724-1728 mission to northern New Spain, in his 1736 book Diario y derrotero de lo caminado.

The Irish-Spaniard monk Juan Agustín Morfi wrote in 1779 the Relación geográfica e histórica de la provincia de Texas o Nuevas Filipinas. His book was translated to English and published in 1935 by Carlos Castañeda as "History of Texas: 1673–1779. By fray Juan Agustin Morfi. Missionary, Teacher, Historian". Morfi is considered the most important chronicler and historian of the New Philippines.

Royal correspondence
Philip V having assented to his governorship of the territory, the Marqués de Aguayo on June 13, 1722, wrote back, thanking the king that the recovery (from the French) of the "New Kingdom of the Philippines, should have been entrusted to my feeble management."

Disestablishment
After Philip V's death in 1746, there were no other Spanish kings named Philip until 2014. The name New Philippines progressively ceased to be used in government reports, the census, instructions, and correspondence, and by the early 1800s few legal documents made reference to the New Philippines, other than in land grants.

With the end of New Spain and the creation of the Mexican Empire in 1821, the sole legal name for the territory of the New Philippines became Provincia de Texas, which years later became part of the Mexican state of Coahuila y Tejas.

Notes

References

Bibliography
  - Access date: May 6, 2002. Read online at DeGruyter

New Spain